Topal is a rural locality (a settlement) in Akhtubinsky Selsoviet, Krasnoyarsky District, Astrakhan Oblast, Russia. The population was 456 as of 2010. There are 3 streets.

Geography 
Topal is located on the Akhtuba River, 65 km northwest of Krasny Yar (the district's administrative centre) by road. Dosang is the nearest rural locality.

References 

Rural localities in Krasnoyarsky District, Astrakhan Oblast